Coming Home is a 1978 American romantic war drama film directed by Hal Ashby from a screenplay written by Waldo Salt and Robert C. Jones with story by Nancy Dowd. It stars Jane Fonda, Jon Voight, Bruce Dern, Penelope Milford, Robert Carradine and Robert Ginty. The film's narrative follows a perplexed woman, her Marine husband and a paraplegic Vietnam War veteran with whom she develops a romantic relationship, while her husband is deployed in Vietnam.

Coming Home was theatrically released on February 15, 1978, to critical and commercial success. Reviewers praised its direction, screenplay and performances, while the film grossed $36 million worldwide against its $3 million budget, becoming the 15th highest-grossing film of 1978. It also premiered at the 1978 Cannes Film Festival, where it competed for the Palme d'Or, with Voight winning the Best Actor Prize.

The film received various awards and nominations. At the 36th Golden Globe Awards, it received six nominations including for the Best Motion Picture – Drama, with Voight and Fonda winning Best Actor and Best Actress respectively. At the 51st Academy Awards, it received eight nominations including for the Best Picture, winning three; Best Original Screenplay with Voight and Fonda winning Best Actor and Best Actress respectively.

Plot 
In 1968 California, Sally (Jane Fonda), a loyal and conservative military wife, is married to Bob Hyde (Bruce Dern), a captain in the United States Marine Corps, who is about to be deployed to Vietnam. As a dedicated military officer, Bob sees the deployment primarily as an opportunity for career progress. At first, Sally dreads being left alone, but after a while, she feels liberated. Forced to find housing away from the base, she moves into a new apartment by the beach and buys a sports car. With nothing else to do, she decides to volunteer at a local Veterans Administration (VA) hospital, partially inspired by her bohemian friend Vi Munson, whose brother Billy (Robert Carradine) has come home with grave emotional problems after just two weeks in Vietnam and now resides in the VA hospital.

At the hospital, Sally meets Luke Martin (Jon Voight), a former high-school classmate. Like his friend Billy, Luke had gone to Vietnam but came back wounded. He is recuperating at the hospital from the injuries he sustained, which left him a paraplegic. Filled with pain, anger and frustration, Luke is now opposed to the war. He is at first a bitter young man, but as he is increasingly thrown into contact with Sally, a relationship starts to develop. Eventually, Luke is released from the hospital, and, newly mobile with his own wheelchair, begins to rebuild his life. His relationship with Sally deepens. She is also transformed by him, and her outlook on life starts to change. They have happy times, play at the beach and fall in love. Meanwhile, Billy, traumatized by his experiences at war, commits suicide by injecting air into his veins. Driven by Billy's suicide, Luke chains himself to the gates of a local recruitment center in a vain attempt to stop others from enlisting.

Sally and Luke eventually make love, confronting his handicap, with Sally experiencing her first orgasm. However, she does not seek a divorce from her husband, and both she and Luke know that their relationship will have to end when Bob returns home. Bob does return, too soon, claiming that he had accidentally wounded himself in the leg. He is also suffering from post-traumatic stress disorder stemming from what he has seen in combat. Bob discovers Sally's affair from Army Intelligence, who have been spying on Luke since the gate incident, and both Sally and Luke agree that Sally should try to patch things up with Bob. Bob loses control, confronting the lovers with a loaded rifle, but ultimately turns away. The final scene shows Luke speaking to young men about his experience in Vietnam, intercut with scenes of Bob placing his neatly folded Marine dress uniform on the beach, taking off his wedding ring, and swimming naked out into the ocean to commit suicide.

Cast

Production 
Coming Home was conceived by Jane Fonda as the first feature for her own production company, IPC Films (for Indochina Peace Campaign), with her associate producer Bruce Gilbert, a friend from her protest days. Fonda wished to make a film about the Vietnam War inspired by her friendship with Ron Kovic, a paraplegic Vietnam War veteran, whom she had met at an antiwar rally. At that time, Kovic had recently completed his autobiographical book Born on the Fourth of July, which later became an Oscar-winning motion picture of the same name directed by Oliver Stone, starring Tom Cruise as Kovic.

In 1972, Fonda hired Nancy Dowd, a friend from her days in the feminist movement, to write a script about the consequences of the war as seen through the eyes of a military wife. Originally, Dowd's story, tentatively titled Buffalo Ghosts, focused on two women, volunteers at a veterans' hospital, who must come to grips with the emotional toll that the war takes on its casualties and their families. The project dragged on for six years until Gilbert and producer Jerome Hellman took it. The screenplay was reshaped significantly by the circle of talent who eventually brought it to the screen: Fonda, Ashby, Wexler, Jon Voight, producer Hellman and screenwriters Waldo Salt and Robert C. Jones. They were united by their opposition to the Vietnam War and by their concern for the veterans who were returning to America and facing difficulties adapting to life back home. Rudy Wurlitzer contributed uncredited work to the script.

John Schlesinger, who had worked with producers Hellman and Voight on Midnight Cowboy, was originally named the director, but he left the project after feeling uncomfortable with the subject matter. He was replaced by Hal Ashby. Fonda was cast from the beginning as Sally Hyde, the housewife. A top box-office star was sought for the male lead to offset the grim nature of the story. Al Pacino, Jack Nicholson and Sylvester Stallone were all offered the part, but declined. Jon Voight had been considered for the role of the husband, but after becoming involved with the film, he campaigned to play the paraplegic veteran. Voight had participated in the anti-war movement and was a friend of Fonda, who was instrumental in helping him land the role, even though he had fallen from popularity since his Midnight Cowboy heyday. Bruce Dern, long stereotyped in sadistic roles, was chosen as the husband. The screenplay was written and rewritten until the project could wait no longer. Jane Fonda, who just finished Julia (1977), was soon to star in Alan J. Pakula's Comes a Horseman (1978). For director Ashby, this was his second film about the 1960s, in addition to his 1975 film Shampoo.

Ashby had cast singer-songwriter Guthrie Thomas to portray the role of Bill Munson after reviewing Thomas' screen test. Thomas joined his close friend Ashby and the entire cast at a restaurant by Malibu Beach before the start of production. Thomas had been previously cast in a previous Ashby film, Bound for Glory, starring David Carradine. Upon completion of the cast meeting, Thomas privately spoke with Ashby and told him, "Hal, I am a singer-songwriter as you know and not an actor. In all fairness to you and this amazing cast you need an extremely talented actor for this role and not a poor singer. I recommend either Bobby Carradine or Keith Carradine." Robert Carradine was cast and portrayed the role of Bill Munson.

Soundtrack 

 The Beatles: Hey Jude, Strawberry Fields Forever; (EMI Records Inc.)
 Big Brother and the Holding Company Featuring Janis Joplin: Call On Me; (Columbia Records)
 Tim Buckley: Once I Was; (Elektra Records)
 Buffalo Springfield: Expecting to Fly, For What It's Worth; (Atlantic Records)
 The Chambers Brothers: Time Has Come Today; (Columbia Records)
 Bob Dylan: Just Like a Woman; (Columbia Records)
 Aretha Franklin: Save Me; (Atlantic Recording Corporation)
 Richie Havens: Follow; (M&M Records Inc.)
 Jimi Hendrix: Manic Depression; (Warner Bros. Records)
 Jefferson Airplane: White Rabbit; (RCA Records)
 The Rolling Stones: Out of Time, No Expectations, Jumpin' Jack Flash, My Girl, Ruby Tuesday, Sympathy for the Devil (ABKCO Records Inc.)
 Simon & Garfunkel: Bookends; (Columbia Records)
 Steppenwolf: Born to Be Wild; (ABC Records Inc.)

Reception 
Coming Home premiered at the 1978 Cannes Film Festival, where Voight won the award for Best Actor for his performance.

The film was released in the U.S. in February 1978. It proved popular with audiences and received generally good reviews. Charles Champlin of the Los Angeles Times commented that: "Despite an over-explicit soundtrack and some moments when the story in fact became a sermon, the movie effectively translated a changed national consciousness into credible and touching personal terms." The Toronto Sun called the film "The Best Years of Our Lives c. 1978 with the same high standards and the same lofty morals of an earlier era."

On review aggregator website Rotten Tomatoes, the film has an approval rating of 86% based on 28 reviews, with a rating average of 7.4/10. The website's critical consensus reads: "Coming Homes stellar cast elevates the love triangle in the center of its story - and adds a necessary human component to its none-too-subtle political message."

The New York Times placed the film on its Best 1000 Movies Ever list.

 Accolades American Film Institute lists'''
 AFI's 100 Years...100 Movies – Nominated
 AFI's 100 Years...100 Passions – #78
 AFI's 100 Years...100 Cheers – Nominated
 AFI's 100 Years...100 Movies (10th Anniversary Edition) – Nominated

 Notes 

 References 

 Bibliography 
 Norden, Martin F, The Cinema of Isolation: a history of physical disability in the movies, Rutgers University Press, 1994, 
 Peary, Danny, Alternative Oscars, Delta, 1993. 
 Wiley, Mason & Bona, Damien, Inside Oscars, Ballantine Books, 1996, 

 External links 

 
 
 
 Biskind, Peter (2008). "The Vietnam Oscars", Vanity Fair'', March 2008 issue, p. 266. Online version retrieved April 6, 2008.

1978 films
1970s war drama films
American war drama films
1970s English-language films
Anti-war films about the Vietnam War
Films about veterans
Films about paraplegics or quadriplegics
Films about disability in the United States
Films about adultery in the United States
Films about post-traumatic stress disorder
Films directed by Hal Ashby
Films featuring a Best Actor Academy Award-winning performance
Films featuring a Best Actress Academy Award-winning performance
Films featuring a Best Drama Actor Golden Globe winning performance
Films featuring a Best Drama Actress Golden Globe-winning performance
Films set in 1968
Films whose writer won the Best Original Screenplay Academy Award
United Artists films
Vietnam War films
Films with screenplays by Waldo Salt
1978 drama films
1970s American films
Films about disability